Druid Hills Historic District is a historic district in Druid Hills and Atlanta in DeKalb County, Georgia, United States, that is listed on the National Register of Historic Places (NRHP).

Description
The district was designed by Frederick Law Olmsted and later by his sons, the Olmsted Brothers. Druid Hills was Atlanta's second major suburb, after Inman Park, and as one of Olmsted's major works, had a significant influence on future suburban development.

Olmsted's 1893 plan for developer Joel Hurt's Kirkwood Land Company was organized around Ponce de Leon Avenue, a broad parkway on either side of a series of parks. Work did not begin until 1905, and in 1908 the development company was sold to Asa Candler, president of the Coca Cola Company and future mayor of Atlanta, who built a mansion at 1428 Ponce de Leon Avenue. Completed in 1936, the development features large mansions on either side of the central parkway overlooking the parks, designed by such architects as Henry Hornbostel, Neel Reid, Walter T. Downing and Arthur Neal Robinson.

The Druid Hills Historic District was listed on the NRHP April 11, 1979. It incorporates the earlier Druid Hills Parks and Parkways Historic District that was listed on the National Register October 25, 1975.

The Druid Hills Parks and Parkways district included Colonial Revival, Tudor Revival, Italian Renaissance Revival architecture in buildings along both sides of Ponce de Leon Avenue between Briarcliff Road and the Seaboard Coast Line RR tracks.  This was a  area that included a total of eight contributing buildings and one other contributing structure.  The 1979 expanded listing included an area of  including Late 19th and 20th Century Revivals, Classical Revival, and Bungalow/Craftsman architecture.

See also

 National Register of Historic Places listings in Fulton County, Georgia
 National Register of Historic Places listings in DeKalb County, Georgia

References

External links

 Druid Hills Historic District at Atlanta: A National Register of Historic Places Travel Itinerary
 Emory Village historic preservation incl. history of Emory Village

Historic districts in Atlanta
Neoclassical architecture in Georgia (U.S. state)
Bungalow architecture in Georgia (U.S. state)
Colonial Revival architecture in Georgia (U.S. state)
Tudor Revival architecture in Georgia (U.S. state)
Italian Renaissance Revival architecture in the United States
Geography of DeKalb County, Georgia
Druid Hills, Georgia
Historic districts on the National Register of Historic Places in Georgia (U.S. state)
National Register of Historic Places in Atlanta
1975 establishments in Georgia (U.S. state)